The Riout 102T Alérion is a ornithopter built in 1937 designed by René Riout. The Alérion went through a series of ground tests including in the Chalais-Meudon wind tunnel 1938 when the wings suffered a structural failure. Further development was abandoned with the start of World War II. It never flew and was stored until it was found in 2005 and brought to the Musée Régional de l'Air at Angers, where it was partially restored.

References

External Links 
 The Riout 102T Alérion Ornithopter; Frank Herbert’s Inspiration?

Helicopters